The 2002 Finlandia Trophy is an annual senior-level international figure skating competition held in Finland. It was held in Helsinki on October 5–6, 2002. Skaters competed in the disciplines of men's singles, ladies' singles, and pair skating.

Results

Men

Ladies

Pairs

External links
 2002 Finlandia Trophy results

Finlandia Trophy
Finlandia Trophy, 2002
Finlandia Trophy, 2002